Diadema is the term for diadem in most Romance languages, and in English may refer to:

 Diadema, São Paulo, a city in São Paulo state, Brazil
 Diadema (sea urchin), a genus of sea urchin belonging to the family Diadematidae
 Diadema (fungus), a genus of fungi in the family Diademaceae
 Damon diadema, a species of arachnid, sometimes known as the tailless whip scorpion
 Sinea diadema, a species of the assassin bug family, native to North America